BLOM BANK (French: Banque du Liban et D’Outre Mer; Arabic: بنك لبنان والمهجر) is a Lebanese bank established in 1951 and has been frequently selected as the Best Bank in Lebanon by the most recognized regional and international financial institutions such as Euromoney and The Banker. Its business operations are based on a universal banking model that includes: Commercial Banking, Corporate Banking, Private Banking, Investment Banking, Asset Management, Retail Banking, Islamic Banking, Brokerage Services, and Insurance Products and Services.

History
BLOM BANK started operating in 1951 in Beirut. Its establishment coincided with a booming period in the banking sector in Lebanon. One of the founders was Hussein Al Oweini, a Lebanese politician and businessman. By 1953, BLOM BANK started expanding and opened a branch in Jeddah, KSA. As the Lebanese Civil War broke out, BLOM BANK’s operations abroad increased to cater for the need of the Lebanese diaspora. Today, The Group is present in 11 countries across the world. On the leadership level, Naaman Azhari became the General Manager of the Bank in 1962 and Chairman of the Board and General Manager in 1971. In 2007, Dr. Naaman Azhari was appointed Chairman of BLOM BANK Group, and Honorary Chairman of BLOM BANK Group in 2020, while his son, Saad Azhari, became Chairman of the Board and General Manager of BLOM BANK.

The bank adopted BLOM BANK as its brand name in 2000 and acquired the Lebanese subsidiary of HSBC Bank Middle East in 2017. 

As of 2016, it was "Lebanon's First-largest bank by market capitalisation."

Bank's Network and Subsidiaries
The Group conducts its worldwide operations through a network of banking and financial units, either directly or through its subsidiaries.

In January 2021 the company sold its Egyptian subsidiary to Bank ABC of Bahrain for $427 million.

Sustainability 
In terms of Sustainability, BLOM BANK joined, in December 2014, the UN Global Compact committing to respect its ten principles, to take action in support of UN Goals and to submit annually a Communication on Progress Report. As a next step to signing the UNGC, the Board of Directors approved, in April 2015, the establishment of a “Sustainability Committee” which is an advisory and consultative body with a primary purpose of assisting the Board of Directors in fulfilling its oversight responsibilities in relation to the Bank’s Sustainability policies and programs, and the Bank’s social responsibility performance.

BLOM BANK offers various programs and projects that complement its adopted policies. On the environmental level, BLOM BANK adopts numerous policies aiming to reduce the bank’s footprint on the environment including paper recycling and reduction practices, a waste segregation program, a sustainable procurement policy, and an energy consumption reduction plan.

On the social level, BLOM Shabeb Program is deployed as a platform that helps the Lebanese young generation plan their education and facilitate their career choice to ensure a successful future thus empowering our youth.

On the economic level, BLOM MasterCard “Giving Card”, was deployed in collaboration with the Lebanon Mine Action Center, a unit in the Lebanese Army, to assist in the removal of mines and cluster bombs.

On the corporate governance level, BLOM BANK is the first bank in the Arab World to sign the Investors for Governance and Integrity (IGI) Declaration, committing thus to implement the Governance and Integrity Rating guidelines and recommendations and nurturing ethical behavior.

Following the 17 October Revolution, the bank was declared bankrupt

See also 

 List of banks in Lebanon
 Byblos Bank
 Audi Bank
 Economy of Lebanon

References

Banks of Lebanon
Companies based in Beirut
1951 establishments in Lebanon
Banks established in 1951
Companies listed on the Beirut Stock Exchange